The 2014 USA Sevens (also sometimes referred to as the 2014 Las Vegas Sevens) was the eleventh edition of the USA Sevens tournament, and the fifth tournament of the 2013–14 IRB Sevens World Series. The tournament was held January 24–26, 2014 at Sam Boyd Stadium in Las Vegas, Nevada.

Format
The teams were drawn into four pools of four teams each. Each team played everyone in their pool one time. The top two teams from each pool advanced to the Cup/Plate brackets. The bottom two teams from each group went to the Bowl/Shield brackets.

Teams
The participating teams and schedule were announced on 30 November 2013.

Pool stage

Pool A

Pool B

Pool C

Pool D

Knockout stage

Shield

Bowl

Plate

Cup

References

2014
USA Sevens
USA Sevens
USA Sevens
USA Sevens